Michael Pollack may refer to:
Michael Pollack (songwriter), born 1994
Michael Pollack, the birth name of Michael J. Pollard, actor, 1939–2019